William Mahony, SMA was an Irish Catholic prelate who served as bishop of Roman Catholic Diocese of Ilorin, 29 April 1919 – 15 November 1994. 

The son of Mick and Mary Mahony of Derrybrien, Slieve Aughty, Mahony had two sisters and three brothers. His father, grandfather and two of his brothers were blacksmiths, a motif he incorporated into his coat of arms as a bishop.

Mahony was at the Gort sheep fair when he heard the call of God to become a priest, joining the Society of African Missions in 1936. He studied in Ballinafad Co. Mayo, Cork, Galway, Newry and London. 

Following completing his secondary education St. Josephs Wilton, Cork, he began his university studies in University College Cork,  before moving to the SMA Novitiate at Cloughballymore, Kilcolgan, Co Galway, for two years, studying philosophy and completing his undergraduate degree in University College Galway, earning a B.A. degree (honours) in philosophy and education, in 1943. He entered the SMA major seminary in Dromantine House, Newry, studying theology, and being ordained a priest in St. Colman's Cathedral, in 1947. Following ordination, he gained a teaching diploma from the University of London, in 1948.

In 1948 he was assigned to what would become the Archdiocese of Kaduna in northern Nigeria, teaching there till 1960. In the latter year, he was appointed Prefect Apostolic of Illorin, a province of more than thirty thousand square miles and a population of about one million. He was ordained Bishop of Ilorin on 1 August 1969 in Kampala, Uganda, by the pope.

References 

 Derrybrien Centenary 1895-1995, pp.70-72, ed. Oliver Mahon, 1995. 

People from County Galway
20th-century Roman Catholic bishops in Nigeria
Irish expatriates in Nigeria
Irish expatriate Catholic bishops
Alumni of the University of Galway
Roman Catholic bishops of Ilorin
1919 births
1994 deaths

Society of African Missions